Seru is both a surname and a given name. Notable people with the name include:

People with the surname Seru
Apaitia Seru, successor of Sailosi Kepa
Inoke Seru, leader of a rump of the Fijian Association Party
John Seru (born 1964), Australian entertainer

People with the given name Seru
Abba Seru Gwangul (died 1778), chieftain of an Ethiopian ethnic group
Seru Epenisa Cakobau (1815–1883), Fijian chief and warlord
Various rulers of the Bariba state of Nikki
Seru Rabeni (born 1978), Fijian rugby union footballer

See also   
Seru (disambiguation)